The Olivia Spencer Bower Award is a residency opportunity for New Zealand artists. It is named after the 20th-century New Zealand painter Olivia Spencer Bower.

About the residency

The Olivia Spencer Bower Award was established in 1987. Art critic John Daly-Peoples notes that it was Spencer Bower's intention to "provide talented artists an opportunity to work for one year, free to pursue their own direction without the need to seek outside employment."

The award was initially intended to support women artists only. Final details for the charitable foundation were only finalised five days before the artist died in early July 1982. Bower left all her art works to the foundation, and these have been gradually realised by the trustees to form the capital which entirely funds the award. The award is directed at emerging painters and sculptors and bypasses well-known and established practitioners who may have already received recognition. While the initial instigation for the foundation was perceived inequity between male and female artists the award is open to both men and women artists. Selection is made by a committee which must include at least half females.

Art critic Warren Feeney writes of the award:

Set up by a practising artist as an award for other practising artists its success can be measured in the number of recipients who continue to maintain a substantial presence in the arts. Séraphine Pick, Jim Speers and Kristy Gorman are only three of a very long list. Indeed, rather than her legacy as a painter, the Olivia Spencer Bower Foundation Award has become the vehicle by which the artist is now best-known.

The residency is based in Christchurch, though it is open to artists from around the country. The recipient receives a stipend for the year — currently around $NZ30,000 — and a studio in Christchurch for the year of the residency. Until 2011, the studio was located within the complex of the Christchurch Arts Centre, but since the Arts Centre was damaged in the February 2011 Christchurch Earthquake other studio space was sourced for the time period. Amanda Newall, the 2022 grant recipient, was the first since 2011 to have her residency inside the Arts Centre.

Recipients

1987 Pauline Rhodes
1988 Grant Banbury
1989 Linda James
1990 Joanna Braithwaite
1991 No award
1992 Ruth Watson
1993 Sandra Thomson
1994 Séraphine Pick
1995 Chris Heaphy
1996 Esther Leigh
1997 Saskia Leek
1998 Jim Speers
1999 Kirsty Gregg
2000 James Cousins
2001 Kirsty Gorman
2002 Marcus Moore
2003 Bekah Carran
2004 Hannah Beehre
2005 Victoria Bell
2006 Joanna Langford
2007 Robert Hood
2008 Eddie Clemens
2009 Clare Noonan
2010 Cat Auburn
2011 Georgina E. Hill
2012 Laura Marsh
2013 Miranda Parkes
2014 Emma Fitts
2015 Jacquelyn Greenbank
2016 Christina Read
2017 Daegan Wells
2018 Tyne Gordon
2019 Kim Lowe
2020 Annie McKenzie
2022 Amanda Newall

References

New Zealand art awards
1987 establishments in New Zealand
Awards established in 1987